XII Corps was an army corps of the British Army that fought in the First and Second World Wars. In the First World War, it formed part of the British Salonika Force on the Macedonian front. In the Second World War, it formed part of the British Second Army during Operation Overlord and the subsequent North-West Europe Campaign of 1944-45.

First World War
XII Corps was formed in France on 8 September 1915 under the command of Lt-Gen Sir Henry Fuller Maitland Wilson. In November 1915, XII Corps was sent from France with 22nd, 26th and 28th Divisions under command to reinforce Allied forces on the Macedonian front. Wilson and his corps headquarters (HQ) arrived at the port of Salonika on 12 November, but the commander of the British Salonika Force (BSF) took XII Corp’s staff to establish his own HQ. On 14 December 1915, the War Office sanctioned the establishment of two corps within the BSF and Wilson reformed XII Corps.

After a period holding the defensive position known as ‘the Birdcage’ around Salonika, XII Corps moved up-country in July 1916, taking over former French positions, but only part was involved in the fighting during the summer and autumn. XII Corps was selected to attack the Bulgarian positions west of Lake Doiran in April 1917. The area to be attacked was ‘a defender’s dream, being a tangled mass of hills cut by numerous ravines’. Wilson planned a three-stage operation to capture the three lines of defences, preceded by a short intense bombardment. The BSF’s commander, Sir George Milne decided that his manpower was too limited, and reduced this to a smaller assault on the first defence line only, preceded by a three-day bombardment to neutralise enemy batteries and destroy trenches and barbed wire. This, of course, lost the element of surprise and the Bulgarians were well aware of what was coming. Only three brigades were engaged, but the casualties were high and little ground was gained. In a second attack two weeks later, the assault troops managed to cross no man’s land, but it was difficult to get information back to HQs, and some companies simply disappeared.

This 1st Battle of Doiran (second battle by Bulgarian reckoning) had been a failure and, with many troops being withdrawn to other theatres, XII Corps did not get another opportunity to launch a major attack until 18 September 1918. On that day, with two brigades of 22nd Division and the Greek Seres Division, XII Corps failed to take ‘Pip Ridge’ and the ‘Grande Couronne’. The following day, the attack was renewed with a brigade from 27th Division supported by the remnants of 22nd Division, the Seres Division, and the French 2nd Regiment of Zouaves. Once more the attack failed with heavy casualties. However, the 2nd Battle of Doiran had served its purpose by drawing Bulgarian attention away from Gen Franchet d’Esperey’s main Franco-Serbian thrust, which broke through the Bulgarian lines further west. On 21 September, the BSF was ordered to pursue the retreating Bulgarians, with XII Corps in the lead. Bulgaria signed an armistice with the Allies on 29 September, but XII Corps continued to advance across Bulgaria towards the Turkish frontier, until the Ottoman Turks also signed the Armistice of Mudros on 31 October.

XII Corps occupied parts of European Turkey and Wilson was appointed GOC Allied Forces Gallipoli and Bosporus. On 11 February 1919, XII Corps ceased to exist, Wilson becoming Commander, Allied Forces Turkey in Europe, British Salonika Army, and British Army of the Black Sea.

First World War order of battle
Order of Battle (March 1917)
22nd Division
26th Division
60th (2/2nd London) Division
Corps Troops:
1/1st Lothians and Border Horse

Second World War

Home defence
XII Corps, which was formed in 1940, came under Commander-in-Chief, Home Forces in the early part of the Second World War. It was based at 10 Broadwater Down in Royal Tunbridge Wells in Kent. Lieutenant-General Sir Bernard Montgomery was its commander from 27 April 1941 until 13 August 1942, when he was sent to Egypt to take command of the British Eighth Army.

Order of Battle, June - October 1940
 1st London Infantry Division (renamed 56th (London) Infantry Division 18 November 1940)
 45th Infantry Division
 Royal Artillery
 60th (North Midland) Army Field Regiment, Royal Artillery
 88th (2nd West Lancashire) Army Field Regiment, Royal Artillery
 74th Medium Regiment, Royal Artillery

North West Europe
XII Corps, now commanded by Lieutenant-General Neil Ritchie, was designated as one of the follow-up corps of the British Second Army, commanded by Lieutenant-General Miles C. Dempsey, and was sent to Normandy, France as part of Operation Overlord, shortly after the Allied invasion of Normandy in June 1944. In July, it took over command of the troops holding the Odon Valley area in July 1944 (previously under command of Lieutenant-General Richard N. O'Connor's VIII Corps). XII Corps then took part in a diversionary action in the area prior to Operation Goodwood (18–20 July 1944), and was then involved in the fighting southwards out of this area in August. XII Corps was the last assignment of the 59th (Staffordshire) Infantry Division prior to the division's disbandment, due to a severe shortage of manpower, in late August.

XII Corps supported the left flank of XXX Corps during Operation Market Garden in September 1944; but, like
VIII Corps on the right flank, struggled to match the pace of XXX Corps' rapid advance. This left XXX Corps' flanks exposed to German counter-attacks on its lines of communication. XII Corps later went on to fight in the rest of the campaign, during operations Pheasant, Blackcock and later in the invasion of Germany.

Order of battle, June 1944
General Officer Commanding Lieutenant-General Neil Ritchie
Corps Troops
 1st The Royal Dragoons (armoured cars)
 86th (5th Devon) Anti-Tank Regiment, Royal Artillery
 112th (Durham Light Infantry) Light Anti-Aircraft Regiment, Royal Artillery
 7th Survey Regiment, Royal Artillery
 XII Corps Troops, Royal Engineers
 XII Corps Signals, Royal Corps of Signals

Attached formations:
  43rd (Wessex) Infantry Division
  53rd (Welsh) Infantry Division
 3rd Army Group, Royal Artillery
 6th Field Regiment, RA
 13th Medium Regiment, RA
 59th (4th West Lancashire) Medium Regiment, RA
 67th Medium Regiment, RA
 72nd Medium Regiment, RA
 59th (Newfoundland) Heavy Regiment, RA

Divisions attached at other times:
  15th (Scottish) Infantry Division
  43rd (Wessex) Infantry Division
  46th Infantry Division
  52nd (Lowland) Infantry Division
  56th (London) Infantry Division
  59th (Staffordshire) Infantry Division

Order of Battle, 14–26 January 1945 (Operation Blackcock)
 7th Armoured Division
 52nd (Lowland) Infantry Division
 43rd (Wessex) Infantry Division
 In support:
 8th Armoured Brigade
 214th Infantry Brigade
 6th Guards Tank Brigade
 79th Armoured Division
 3rd and 9th AGRA

General Officers Commanding
Commanders included:
1915 – 1917 Lieutenant-General Sir Henry Wilson
1917 Major-General E. C. W. Mackenzie-Kennedy (temporary)
1917 – 1918 Lieutenant-General Sir Henry Wilson
Jun 1940-Apr 1941 Lieutenant-General Andrew Thorne
Apr 1941-Nov 1941 Lieutenant-General Bernard Montgomery 
Nov 1941-Sep 1942 Lieutenant-General James Gammell
Nov 1942-Nov 1943 Lieutenant-General Montagu Stopford
Dec 1943-May 1945 Lieutenant-General Neil Ritchie

Notes

References
Brig-Gen Sir James E. Edmonds, Official History of the Great War, Military Operations: France and Belgium 1915, Volume II, Battle of Aubers Ridge, Festubert, and Loos, London: Macmillan (1928).
Capt Cyril Falls, Official History, Military Operations: Macedonia, Volume I: From the Outbreak of War to Spring 1917, London: HMSO (1933).
Capt Cyril Falls, Official History, Military Operations: Macedonia, Volume II: From the Spring of 1917 to the End of the War, London: HMSO (1935).
George Forty, British Army Handbook 1939-1945, Stroud: Sutton (1998).
Peter Harclerode, Arnhem: A Tragedy of Errors, Caxton Editions (1994).
 Col L.F. Morling, Sussex Sappers: A History of the Sussex Volunteer and Territorial Army Royal Engineer Units from 1890 to 1967, Seaford: 208th Field Co, RE/Christians–W.J. Offord, 1972.
 
Alan Wakefield & Simon Moody, Under the Devil's Eye: Britain's Forgotten Army at Salonika 1915-1918''', Stroud; Sutton Publishing (2004).
 Graham E. Watson & Richard A. Rinaldi, The Corps of Royal Engineers: Organization and Units 1889–2018'', Tiger Lily Books, 2018, .

External links
The Long Long Trail
Royal Artillery 1939-45
Regiments.org

British field corps
Corps of the British Army in World War I
Corps of the British Army in World War II
Military units and formations of the British Empire in World War II